51823 Rickhusband, provisional designation , is a dark Lixiaohua asteroid from the outer regions of the asteroid belt, approximately 9 kilometers in diameter.

It was discovered on 18 July 2001, by astronomers of the Near-Earth Asteroid Tracking at Palomar Observatory in California, United States. The asteroid was named after American astronaut Rick Husband, who died in the Space Shuttle Columbia disaster.

Orbit and classification 

Rickhusband is a member of the Lixiaohua family, an outer-belt asteroid family of more than 700 known members, which consists of C- and X-type asteroids.

It orbits the Sun in the outer main-belt at a distance of 2.5–3.8 AU once every 5 years and 7 months (2,036 days). Its orbit has an eccentricity of 0.22 and an inclination of 12° with respect to the ecliptic.

Physical characteristics

Rotation period 

As of 2017, no rotational lightcurve of Rickhusband has been obtained from photometric observations. The asteroid's rotation period, poles and shape remains unknown.

Diameter and albedo 

According to the survey carried out by the NEOWISE mission of NASA's Wide-field Infrared Survey Explorer, Rickhusband measures 8.731 kilometers in diameter and its surface has an albedo of 0.048.

Naming 

This minor planet was named in memory of American astronaut Rick Husband (1957–2003), who was the commander of STS-107 and was killed in the Space Shuttle Columbia disaster on 1 February 2003. The official naming citation was published by the Minor Planet Center on 6 August 2003.

References

External links 
 NASA JPL - Space Shuttle Columbia Tribute page
 Orbital simulation and data for 51823 Rickhusband
 Asteroid Lightcurve Database (LCDB), query form (info )
 Dictionary of Minor Planet Names, Google books
 Asteroids and comets rotation curves, CdR – Observatoire de Genève, Raoul Behrend
 Discovery Circumstances: Numbered Minor Planets (50001)-(55000) – Minor Planet Center
 
 

051823
051823
Named minor planets
20010718